The Diana Stakes is an American Thoroughbred horse race. Named for the mythological goddess Diana, the race is run each year at Saratoga Race Course in Saratoga Springs, New York. Inaugurated in 1939, it is open to fillies and mares age three and up willing to race the one and one-eighth miles on the turf. The race is a Grade I with a current purse of $500,000. It became a Grade I race in 2003.

From inception in 1939 to 1973, the race was run on Saratoga Race Course's dirt track. Because of large fields, it was split into two divisions in 1973, 1982, and 1983. The race was run at Belmont Park from 1943 to 1945 due to travel restrictions during World War II.

Records
Speed:  (at current  miles on grass)
 1:45.06 – In Italian (GB) (2022)

Wins: 
 2 – Miss Grillo (1946, 1947)
 2 – Searching (1956, 1958) 
 2 – Tempted (1959, 1960)
 2 – Shuvee (1970, 1971) 
 2 – Hush Dear (1982, 1983) 
 2 – Glowing Honor (1988, 1989)
 2 – Forever Together (2008, 2009)
 2 – Sistercharlie (2018, 2019)

Most wins by an owner:
 6 – Rokeby Stable (1967, 1968, 1976, 1984, 1988, 1989)

Most wins by a jockey:
 6 – John Velazquez (1995, 2001, 2005, 2015, 2018, 2019)

Most wins by a trainer:
 7 – Chad Brown (2011, 2016, 2017, 2018, 2019, 2020, 2022)

Winners

 * 1968 – Gamely won the race but was disqualified.

References

Graded stakes races in the United States
Mile category horse races for fillies and mares
Grade 1 turf stakes races in the United States
Horse races in New York (state)
Turf races in the United States
Saratoga Race Course
Recurring sporting events established in 1939
1939 establishments in New York (state)